New Belgium Brewing Company is a nationally distributed brewery in the United States. The brand produces Fat Tire Amber Ale, Voodoo Ranger IPA, Mural Agua Fresca Cerveza, and La Folie Sour Brown Ale, among other regular and seasonal beer varieties.  Founded by Kim Jordan and Jeff Lebesch in 1991 in Fort Collins, Colorado, the company expanded to Asheville, North Carolina, in 2016 and Denver, Colorado, in 2018.

History
Co-Founder Kim Jordan, once a Social-Working, Firefighter, and EMT, was inspired to created a beer company with other co-founder, Jeff Lebesch in 1991. New Belgium became Colorado's first certified BCorps, and for a time was completely 100% employee owned.

The Fat Tire recipe originates from a co-founder's bicycle trip through Belgium from brewery to brewery. The company promotes its Fat Tire ale locally by the public placement of colorful vintage bicycles outside its brewery, which is located adjacent to the public bike path along the Cache La Poudre River.

Before 2002, New Belgium distributed in only 16 states; by 2015, it had become the fourth-largest craft brewer in the country and the eighth-overall largest brewer in the United States. 

Lebesch left the company in 2009.

As of August 2017, New Belgium was available in all 50 states.

As of February 2018, New Belgium was distributed in Canada, Australia, Japan, South Korea, Sweden and Norway.

In 2019, New Belgium was acquired by Lion, an Australian subsidiary of Kirin beverage group of Japan.

Business and production
New Belgium's main brewery is in Fort Collins. In 2013, New Belgium had some 480 employees and more than $180 million in sales. It has had an employee stock ownership plan since 2000 and in January 2013 became 100 percent employee-owned through an ESOP.  The 2014 documentary   We The Owners examined New Belgium's focus on employee-ownership and how that shapes its overall culture of collaboration.  2016 saw new additions to the brand, debuts of Voodoo Ranger and Day Blazer line.

New Belgium is known for its quirky corporate culture; the company employs eight "carnies," who work the brewery's Tour de Fat fundraising events, in addition to chemists, microbiologists, electricians, forklift operators, and engineers. The company has low (3 percent) annual employee turnover, and a tenth of the brewery's employees may take extended leave in any given year. Employees who become part-owners of the business are recognized at an annual Ownership Induction Ceremony and are presented with a cruiser bicycle recalling the company's symbol. The company was named one of the "25 Most Audacious Companies" by Inc. magazine.

Esquire selected Fat Tire Amber Ale as one of the "Best Canned Beers to Drink Now" in a February 2012 article.

In May 2014, New Belgium began work on a second brewery in Asheville, North Carolina, which became fully operational in May 2016. The brewery is positioned along the French Broad River on Craven Street in Asheville's River Arts District.

Label design

Most of New Belgium's beer labels were initially designed by Anne Fitch, a watercolorist whose work appeared on all New Belgium beers for 19 years.

In 2006, NBB changed its logo because it realised that beer drinkers could identify the Fat Tire label, but "didn't recognize the brewery label, or make the connection that New Belgium brewed Fat Tire and other best-selling brands, such as Sunshine Wheat." The company's new logo "pays homage to the well-known Fat Tire brand bicycle" drawn by Anne Fitch.   Kim Jordan, the president of New Belgium Brewery, credits the success of New Belgium Brewery in part on Fitch's artwork: "Our beers were good, our labels were interesting to people, and we pretty quickly had a fairly robust following." In 2010, however, New Belgium unveiled its four-beer Explore Series, whose labels featured a different design.

References

Kirin Group
Mitsubishi companies
Beer brewing companies based in Colorado
Companies based in Fort Collins, Colorado
Privately held companies based in Colorado
American companies established in 1991
1991 establishments in Colorado
Benefit corporations
Food and drink companies established in 1991
B Lab-certified corporations